Mammillaria weingartiana is a species of plant in the family Cactaceae. It is endemic to Nuevo León state, Mexico.

Habitat
They live within a terrestrial system, and their habitat can be found on sloping terrains among chalky rocks in deserts in Nuevo León in Mexico. The subpopulations are small and scattered widely within a large range.

The average temperature that they can live in is about 50° Fahrenheit. They do best in light shade sun exposure. They have yellowish flowers with brownish mid-veins. They can either grow solitary or within small groups.

Conservation
This species is recorded to be vulnerable to becoming an endangered species due to illegal collecting of this cactus for the commercial and amateur trade. Within the last ten years, there has been a ten percent decrease in the population and the population trend is currently decreasing.

References

weingartiana
Cacti of Mexico
Endemic flora of Mexico
Flora of Nuevo León
Vulnerable plants
Taxonomy articles created by Polbot